Jean Le Dû (28 March 1938 – 6 May 2020) was a French linguist of the Breton language.

Biography
For fifty years, Le Dû collected documents on the Breton language in Plougrescant. In 2012, he published a dictionary for Breton and French translations, titled Le trégorrois à Plougrescant. His discovery of the language came during his childhood in Dieppe.

Le Dû held a doctoral degree in phonetic English. He worked at the University of Rennes and taught courses in Breton, Irish, and other Celtic languages. He was a professor emeritus at the University of Western Brittany. Le Dû was the Director of Research Group 9 of the French National Centre for Scientific Research from 1988 to 1996.

Le Dû was a member of the French Communist Party. He was married to a professor of physics and chemistry, and had two daughters named Mai and Donaig.[10] He died on 6 May 2020 at the age of 82 in Saint-Quay-Portrieux.

Works
Dictionnaire pratique français-breton (1976)
Ar brezoneg dre zelled, kleved, komz ha lenn (1993)
Nouvel atlas linguistique de la Basse-Bretagne (2001)
Proverbes et Dictions de Basse-Bretagne
Anthologie des expressions de Basse-Bretagne (1999)
Du café vous aurez? (2002)
Une vie irlandaise du Connemara à Ráth Chairn, histoire de la vie de Micil Chonraí (2010)
Le trégorrois à Plougrescant. Dictionnaire breton français (2012)
Le trégorrois à Plougrescant. Dictionnaire français breton (2012)

References

Linguists from France
Linguists of Breton
1938 births
2020 deaths
People from Dieppe, Seine-Maritime
French Communist Party members